Christopher Cantwell may refer to:

Christopher Cantwell (filmmaker), co-creator of the TV series Halt and Catch Fire
Christopher Cantwell (white supremacist) (born 1980)